Short Street may refer to the following places:
 Short Street, Fremantle, Western Australia, Australia
 Short Street, Wiltshire, a hamlet in Chapmanslade, Wiltshire, England